Brooke Pancake (born June 6, 1990) is an American professional golfer. She became a member of the LPGA Tour in 2012 and after she led the Alabama Crimson Tide golf team to the 2012 national championship. Pancake was a three-time All-American at Alabama and turned pro following her senior season in June 2012.

College career
As a member of the Crimson Tide, Pancake played for head coach Mic Potter. During her sophomore year, she was a member of the first Alabama squad to capture the Southeastern Conference (SEC) championship in women's golf since the inception of the program in 1974. Prior to the start of her senior year, Pancake lost in the semifinals of the U.S. Women's Amateur at Rhode Island Country Club to Danielle Kang.

During her senior season, Pancake led the Crimson Tide to their first overall national championship in 2012. At the championship, Pancake finished second individually with a 72-hole score of 2-under-par at 286. In recognition of her accomplishments on the course, Pancake won the Honda Sports Award as the top collegiate golfer for the 2011–12 academic year. She was also recognized as an All-American for her play during her final three years with the Crimson Tide.

In addition to her recognitions for play on the course, Pancake was also noted for academic achievement. She was awarded the Edith Cummings Munson Golf Award (2011 and 2012), the Elite 89 Award (2010), SEC Women's Golf Scholar-Athlete of the Year (2010, 2011 and 2012) and NGCA Scholar Athlete (2010, 2011 and 2012). After the 2012 season, Pancake was recognized as the Academic All-America Team Member of the Year, the top student-sportsperson for her senior year. She was both the first athlete from Alabama and first female golfer to be recognized with the award.

Professional career
After she completed her senior season at Alabama, Pancake turned pro in June 2012. She made her professional debut at the 2012 U.S. Women's Open where she missed the cut. In June 2013, Pancake had her best finish as a professional at the Walmart NW Arkansas Championship when she came in tied at 13th.

She is sponsored by Waffle House.

Results in LPGA majors
Results not in chronological order before 2015.

^ The Evian Championship was added as a major in 2013.

CUT = missed the half-way cut
T = tied

Team appearances
Amateur
Curtis Cup (representing the United States): 2012

References

External links

Profile at RollTide.com

American female golfers
Alabama Crimson Tide women's golfers
LPGA Tour golfers
Golfers from Tennessee
Sportspeople from Chattanooga, Tennessee
1990 births
Living people